Leslie Lyles is an American actress. She appeared in more than forty films and television serials between 1987 and 2011. 
She is the ex-wife of actor Keith Reddin.

Selected filmography

References

External links
 

Living people
American film actresses
Monmouth University alumni
Place of birth missing (living people)
21st-century American actresses
20th-century American actresses
Year of birth missing (living people)